The Mehri (var. al-Mahrah, al-Meheri, al-Mahri or al-Mahra, also known as the al-Mahrah tribe, are an Arabian ethnic group primarily inhabiting South Arabia and the Guardafui Channel island of Socotra.

Origin
They are descended from Mahra bin Heydan bin 'Amr bin el-Hafi Quda'a bin Malik bin 'Amr bin Murra bin Zeyd bin Malik bin Ḥimyar. Which means Mahra son of Heydan son of 'Amr son of el-Hafi Quda'a son of Malik son of 'Amr son of Murra son of Zeyd son of Malik son of Ḥimyar.

Distribution
The Mehri are one of the largest tribes in the Al Mahrah Governorate of Yemen and in the island of Socotra and Dhofar Governorate of Oman. Mehri group members are also found in other countries in the Arabian Peninsula, mainly Oman, Kuwait, Saudi Arabia, United Arab Emirates and Somalia.

According to Ethnologue, there are around 115,200 total Mehri speakers. Of those, 50,000 live in Yemen (2011), 50,800 in Oman (2000), and 14,400 in Kuwait (2000), and according to Saudi officials there are around 20,000 Mehri speakers in Saudi Arabia.

Language
The Mehri speak the Mehri language as their native tongue. It belongs to the Modern South Arabian (MSA) subgroup of the Afroasiatic family's Semitic branch.

Mehri is divided into two main dialects: Eastern Mehri (Mehriyot) and Western Mehri (Mehriyet). These idioms in turn have urban and Bedouin varieties.

On the island of Socotra, the Mehri inhabitants speak the native Soqotri language of the Soqotri people.

The Mehri language is most closely related to other Modern South Arabian languages, such as Bathari and Soqotri. These tongues collectively share many features with the Old South Arabian languages (Epigraphic South Arabian), as spoken by the ancient Sabaeans, Minaeans, and Qatabanians.

Additionally, many Mehri in Yemen speak as a second language Arabic.

Religion
The Mehri are predominantly Muslims.

Genetics
According to Y-DNA analysis by Černý et al. (2009), most inhabitants of Socotra, some of whom are Mehri descendants, belong to the basal haplogroup J. Around 71.4% of them carry J*(xJ1,J2), which is the highest reported frequency of the paternal clade.

Maternally, basal haplogroup N likewise occurs at its highest frequencies on the island (24.3%). Mitochondrial analysis by Non (2010) found that the haplogroup R0a (27.7%) is the most common mtDNA clade among the Mehri within the Mahra Governorate. The next most frequent maternal lineages borne by the Mehri are the haplogroups H (13.9%), R2 (13.9%), L2a1 (4.6%), and K (1.5%), as well as various subclades of the macro-haplogroup L(xM,N) (21.5%).

See also
Mahra Sultanate
Socotra

Notes

References
Ethnologue - Mehri language

Yule, P. (2018). “Toward an identity of the Samad period population (Sultanate of Oman)”. Zeitschrift für Orient-Archäologie 11, 438–86. .

Yemeni tribes
Afroasiatic peoples
Ethnic groups in Oman
Ethnic groups in Somalia
Ethnic groups in Yemen
Social groups of the United Arab Emirates
Ethnic groups in the Middle East
South Arabia